Sarawut Kanlayanabandit (born 27 May 1991), is a Thai professional footballer who plays as a centre-back.

International career
He represented Thailand U23 in the 2014 Asian Games.

International

Honours

Club
Loei City
 Regional League North-East Division 
   Champions (1) : 2009

Kasetsart University
 Regional League Bangkok Area Division 
   Champions (1) : 2011

References

External links
 

1991 births
Living people
Sarawut Kanlayanabandit
Sarawut Kanlayanabandit
Association football central defenders
Sarawut Kanlayanabandit
Sarawut Kanlayanabandit
Sarawut Kanlayanabandit
Sarawut Kanlayanabandit
Sarawut Kanlayanabandit
Sarawut Kanlayanabandit
Sarawut Kanlayanabandit
Sarawut Kanlayanabandit
Footballers at the 2014 Asian Games
Sarawut Kanlayanabandit